And God Smiled at Me is a 1972 family drama film produced by Sampaguita Pictures and VP pictures.  It is the official entry to the 3rd Quezon City Film Festival. The movie gave Aunor her first best actress award and marks her as a dramatic actress.  The movie was also the top grosser of the film festival for that particular year.

Cast
Nora Aunor ... Celina
Tirso Cruz III ... Carding
Luis Gonzales ... Damian
Lucita Soriano ... Olga
Naty Santiago ... Celina's Mother
Nenita Jana ... Carding's Mother / Laundry Woman

Trivia
This was Aunor's first film that gave her, her first ever best actress trophy.

Awards and recognition

References

External links 
 

Philippine drama films
1972 films
Filipino-language films
1972 drama films